Bonnie Bedelia Culkin (born ) is an American actress. After beginning her career in theatre in the 1960s, Bedelia starred in the CBS daytime soap opera Love of Life and made her film debut in The Gypsy Moths. Bedelia subsequently appeared in the films They Shoot Horses, Don't They?, Lovers and Other Strangers, Heart Like a Wheel, The Prince of Pennsylvania, Die Hard, Die Hard 2, Presumed Innocent, and Needful Things.

For her television work, Bedelia has earned two Emmy Awards nominations. From 2001 to 2004, Bedelia played the lead role in the Lifetime television drama series The Division. She later starred as family matriarch Camille Braverman in the NBC drama series Parenthood (2010–2015).

Early life and education
Bedelia was born in the Manhattan borough of New York City, the daughter of Marian Ethel (née Wagner), a writer and editor, and Philip Harley Culkin, who was in public relations and 50 years old at the time. She was born in a difficult financial period when her father's firm went bankrupt, and they lived in "a cold-water tenement flat". Her mother died when she was 14 and her father, "who had always had ulcers", died shortly afterward. She has two brothers, one of whom is actor Kit Culkin, and a sister, Candice Culkin. She is the aunt of actors Macaulay, Kieran, and Rory Culkin.

Bedelia studied dance in her youth, at School of American Ballet. She received her acting training at HB Studio.

Career
Before becoming an actress, Bedelia studied ballet and appeared in a few productions with the New York City Ballet, including The Nutcracker. Her only dancing role onscreen was  that of Clara in the Playhouse 90 television production of the George Balanchine Nutcracker (1958). From 1961 to 1967, Bedelia was a regular on the CBS soap opera Love of Life, portraying Sandy Porter. She also worked on Broadway, where she debuted supporting Patty Duke in 1962, in Isle of Children, and won a Theatre World Award for playing the lead of in My Sweet Charlie, in 1966.

Bedelia made her film debut in The Gypsy Moths in 1969; later that year she attracted attention as the pregnant marathon dancer in They Shoot Horses, Don't They? She starred in the comedy Lovers and Other Strangers (1970), had dramatic roles in The Strange Vengeance of Rosalie (1972) and Between Friends (1973), and appeared opposite Richard Dreyfuss in the comedy The Big Fix (1978). On television she played the leading role in the short-lived ABC drama series, The New Land (1974).

In 1984, Bedelia received critical acclaim and was nominated for a Golden Globe for her starring role in Heart Like a Wheel (1983), as drag racer Shirley Muldowney. Other well-known performances include her portrayals of Holly Gennero McClane, the wife of Bruce Willis's character John McClane in Die Hard (1988) and Die Hard 2 (1990), and of Barbara Sabich, the wife of Harrison Ford's character in Presumed Innocent (1990).

Bedelia appeared in two Stephen King screen adaptations: Salem's Lot (1979) and Needful Things (1993). She was nominated for Emmy Awards for her performance in the Showtime anthology series Fallen Angels (1993) and for the leading role in the made-for-television movie Locked in Silence (1999). She played a number of leading roles in television films and miniseries, such as Switched at Birth, A Mother's Right: The Elizabeth Morgan Story, Her Costly Affair, and Picnic. From 2001 to 2004, Bedelia starred as Capt. Kate McCafferty in the Lifetime television drama series The Division. She later guest-starred in Big Love and CSI: Crime Scene Investigation, and starred opposite Rue McClanahan and Olivia Newton-John in the 2008 sitcom Sordid Lives: The Series.

Bedelia starred in the NBC drama series Parenthood (2010-2015) as the family matriarch, Camille Braverman.

In 2017, she appeared in season 2 of the TV series Designated Survivor, and in two Hallmark movies. In 2019, she guest starred on the Netflix series What/If.

Personal life
Bedelia married scriptwriter Ken Luber on April 24, 1969. Before divorcing in 1980, the couple had two sons, Uri (b. 1970) and Jonah (b. 1976). She was also married briefly to musician and screenwriter Jay Telfer and then wed actor Michael MacRae in 1995.

Filmography

Film

Television films

Television series

Awards and nominations

References

External links

 
 
 

Living people
20th-century American actresses
21st-century American actresses
Actresses from New York City
American film actresses
American television actresses
American soap opera actresses
People from Manhattan
Theatre World Award winners
1948 births